Srednji Vrh is a settlement in the Municipality of Kranjska Gora in the Upper Carniola region of Slovenia.

Notable people
Notable people that were born or lived in Srednji Vrh include:
Lovrenc Lavtižar (1820–1858), missionary

References

External links

Srednji Vrh on Geopedia

Populated places in the Municipality of Kranjska Gora